The women's elimination race competition at the 2021 UEC European Track Championships was held on 6 October 2021.

Results

References

Women's elimination race
European Track Championships – Women's elimination race